Take Everything is the 6th studio album released by the Christian rock group, Seventh Day Slumber. Most of the songs are remakes of other artists songs done with different arrangement.  Their song "Oceans From The Rain" was originally released on the album Once Upon a Shattered Life. The Album peaked at No. 141 on the Billboard 200 and No. 11 on the Top Christian Albums charts. "Surrender" placed on the X 2009 Christian rock hits compilation.

Track listing

References

2009 albums
BEC Recordings albums
Seventh Day Slumber albums